Armin Meiwes (born 1 December 1961) is a German former computer repair technician who received international attention for murdering and eating a voluntary victim in 2001, whom he had found via the Internet. After Meiwes and the victim jointly attempted to eat the victim's severed penis, Meiwes killed his victim and proceeded to eat a large amount of his flesh. He was arrested in December 2002. In January 2004, Meiwes was convicted of manslaughter and sentenced to eight years and six months in prison. In a retrial in May 2006, he was convicted of murder and sentenced to life imprisonment.

Biography

Early life 
Armin Meiwes was born on 1 December 1961, the only child of Waltrud Meiwes (1919–1999). He had two older half-brothers from his father's previous relationship with another woman. His father abandoned Armin when he was eight, leaving him to be raised by his mother. During sessions with police experts, Meiwes had explained that his desire for cannibalism, related to the fairytale Hansel and Gretel, had developed during his adolescent years. He had also described himself feeling "very lonesome" after "the family had fallen apart".

Murder of Bernd Brandes and cannibalism 
Looking for a willing volunteer, Meiwes posted an advertisement on the then-active website The Cannibal Cafe (a defunct forum for people with a cannibalism fetish). Meiwes's advertisement stated that he was "looking for a well-built 18- to 25-year-old to be slaughtered and then consumed." Bernd Jürgen Armando Brandes, a 43-year-old engineer from Berlin, answered the advertisement in March 2001. Many other people responded to the advertisement but backed out; Meiwes did not attempt to force them to do anything against their will.

The two made a videotape when they met on 9 March 2001 in Meiwes's home, in the small town of Wüstefeld, west of Rotenburg an der Fulda. The video shows Meiwes amputating Brandes's penis (with his agreement) and the two men attempting to eat it together. Before doing so, Brandes swallowed twenty sleeping pills, and a bottle of cough syrup, likely causing an effect of slowed breathing and extreme tiredness. Brandes initially insisted that Meiwes attempted to bite his penis off. This did not work, and ultimately, Meiwes used a knife to remove it. Brandes apparently tried to eat some of his own penis raw but could not, because it was too tough and, as he put it, "chewy". Meiwes then fried the penis in a pan with salt, pepper, wine, and garlic; he then fried it with some of Brandes' fat, but by then it was too burnt to be consumed. He then chopped the penis up into chunks and fed it to his dog. According to court officials who saw the video (which has not been made public), Brandes may already have been too weakened from blood loss to eat any of his penis.

Meiwes then ran Brandes a bath, before going to read a Star Trek book, while checking on Brandes every fifteen minutes, during which time Brandes lay bleeding in the bath, drifting in and out of consciousness. After long hesitation and prayer, Meiwes killed Brandes by stabbing him in the throat, after which he hung the body on a meat hook. The incident was recorded on a four-hour videotape, which has never been released to the public due to its gruesome contents. Four screenshots can be found online, but the credibility of the screenshots has never been proven. According to prosecutors, Meiwes committed the act for sexual pleasure.

Arrest, trial and manslaughter conviction 
Meiwes was arrested in December 2002, when a college student alerted authorities to new advertisements for victims online. Investigators searched his home and found body parts and the videotape of the killing.

Meiwes was diagnosed with a schizoid personality but deemed fit to stand trial. On 30 January 2004, Meiwes was convicted of manslaughter and sentenced to eight years and six months in prison. The case attracted considerable media attention.

When speaking to a German newspaper, Meiwes admitted cannibalising Brandes and expressed regret for his actions. He added he wants to write a biography with the aim of deterring anyone wanting to follow in his footsteps. Websites dedicated to Meiwes started appearing after his 2002 arrest, with people advertising for willing victims. "They should go for treatment, so it doesn't escalate like it did with me," said Meiwes. While in prison, Meiwes has since become a vegetarian. He believes there are about 800 cannibals in Germany.

Retrial and murder conviction 
In April 2005, a German court ordered a retrial after prosecutors appealed Meiwes's sentence, arguing that he should have been convicted of murder because he killed for sexual gratification, a motive proved by his having videotaped the crime. The court ruled that the original trial had ignored the significance of the video in disproving the argument that Meiwes only killed because he had been asked to kill.

At his retrial, a psychologist stated that Meiwes could reoffend, as he "still had fantasies about devouring the flesh of young people." On 10 May 2006, a court in Frankfurt convicted Meiwes of murder and sentenced him to life imprisonment.

Cultural impact

Films
Grimm Love (German title: Rohtenburg; 2006), a feature film directed by Martin Weisz and starring Keri Russell, was banned in Germany after Meiwes complained that his personality rights had been violated. The ban was subsequently lifted by Germany's highest civil court after an appeal. The film won multiple awards at the 2006 Festival de Cine de Sitges, including Best Director, Best Actor for the two male leads, and Best Cinematography.
Cannibal (2006) is a direct-to-video horror film based on Meiwes and Brandes, though the characters do not have names; referred only as "The Man" and "The Flesh". The film was directed and produced by Marian Dora and stars actors Carsten Frank, Victor Brandl and Manoush. The film was banned in Germany.

Other films based on the case include: Rosa von Praunheim's Dein Herz in Meinem Hirn (Your Heart in My Brain) and Ulli Lommel's Diary of a Cannibal.

Music
 The German industrial metal band Rammstein released the song "Mein Teil" in 2004, which specifically references the Meiwes case. MTV Germany restricted airing the video to after 11:00 p.m.
 The rock musician Marilyn Manson has identified Meiwes as an inspiration in the titling of his album Eat Me, Drink Me.
 The Swedish death metal band Bloodbath wrote the song "Eaten", which voices Brandes' desire to be eaten alive, all while witnessing the act.
 The American death metal band Macabre wrote a song about Meiwes called "The Wüstenfeld Man-Eater".
 The Polish death metal band Mind Affliction wrote the song "Armin's Hunger", which describes the night when Brandes' died.
 The heavy metal singer Ozzy Osbourne released his 12th studio album, Ordinary Man, on 21 February 2020. The album includes a song titled "Eat Me", which was inspired by Armin Meiwes.
The American Gothic Band, "The Sons of Perditions" were inspired by the story and wrote "Cannibals of Rotenburg" in their album "The Kingdom is on Fire" in 2007.
 The Swedish death punk band "Bondage Fairies" released the song "Finkus Cooked My Cock" on the album What You Didn't Know When You Hired Me in 2006 which has the lyrics "We ate my penis with my friend Armin Miewes".
 The band SKYND played the song "Armin Meiwes" for the first time in O2 Academy Islington, London on 18 February 2022. The track and its accompanying music video was released on 22 June 2022.

Television
Season 2, Episode 3 of the sitcom The IT Crowd, titled "Moss and the German", parodies the Meiwes case. The character Maurice Moss, thinking he is answering an advert for a German cookery course, ends up in the house of an aspiring German cannibal, where the error is revealed, the fault lying with the man's poor grasp of the English language when writing the advert.
In the American sitcom Brooklyn Nine-Nine the character Jake Peralta makes friends with a cannibal in prison, named Caleb. In Season 6, Episode 17, Jake arrests a murderer that he found through a cannibal forum that Caleb recommended.
In 2008, MORE Music and Media released the four-hour interview and documentary from RTL Extra on DVD as Der Kannibale von Rotenburg; it was released in the UK as Armin Meiwes: The Cannibal.
An episode of the British medical documentary Body Shock entitled The Man Who Ate His Lover discusses the case in detail.
In season 4, episode 4 of the British comedy series Peep Show, titled "Handyman", main character Mark warns Jeremy that something bad is going to happen if Jeremy continues working for The Orgazoid, mentioning that he might "invite a German off the internet to eat him".
Season 1, episode 1 of the TV series Rake, titled "R.V. Murray", features an accused cannibal who eats his volunteer in similar circumstances to the Meiwes case. Also, season 1, episode 4 of the 2014 American remake of Rake, titled "Cannibal", features an accused cannibal.
An episode of Hannibal had the character of Mason Verger refer to the incident after interrupting the title character's attempt to murder Will Graham; specifically, Hannibal cutting open Will's skull to consume his brain: "You boys remind me of that German cannibal who advertised for a friend and then ate him—and his penis—before he died. Tragedy being the penis was overcooked. Go to all that trouble to eat a friend and you overcook his penis! They ate it anyway. They had to. They committed. But they didn't enjoy it."
In an August 2016 episode of the Pitchfork series "Over/Under", guest Eric Andre makes reference to Meiwes. "I want to see an episode where Wile E. Coyote violently, savagely, tears Road Runner apart... Eats him alive, you know, cuts his dick off and barbecues it and eats it like that German computer technician did to that guy he found on Craigslist."
American sitcom 30 Rock referenced the case in the seventh-season episode "A Goon's Deed in a Weary World". The character Pete Hornberger (played by Scott Adsit), laments dwindling advertisers on his show. He says that the only advertiser they have left is a German guy who wants to eat someone but "even Gunter's having doubts."
In the season 2 episode "Hungry" of the American anthology series Room 104, two men meet in a hotel room to eat each other's penises. The men, Gene (Mark Proksch) and Dan (Kent Osborne), are interrupted while eating Dan's penis by the police after a concerned call from Dan's wife. After an explanation of the consent given and plan to seek medical attention shortly, the men continue to prepare for the second course (Gene's penis) as the episode ends.
In the TV show Succession (season 2, episode 8), when Roman is having a discussion with Gerry, he mentions "you eat me, I eat you, like they do in Germany."

Theatre
In 2014, TASTE, an award-winning play inspired by the case, premiered in Los Angeles at the Sacred Fools Theater Company. The play was written by Screenwriter Benjamin Brand and directed by Stuart Gordon. The production was nominated for various awards from all of the major Los Angeles theatrical critic organizations. The production starred Chris McKenna and Donal Thoms-Cappello, and was produced by Gordon, Dean Schramm, Ben Rock, and Adam Goldworm.
In 2017, the original musical MEIWES/BRANDES was chosen to be part of The Actors Centre's inaugural John Thaw Initiative. Written by RADA MA graduates Harriet Taylor, Scott Howland, Laura Dorn and Aurora Richardson, the piece uses correspondence between Meiwes and Brandes as well as verbatim court transcripts to recreate their meeting and tell a deeper story about love, pain, queer relationships and mental health.
In 2022, The Royal Theatre in Copenhagen, Denmark, premiered the play KANNIBALEN by playwright Johannes Lilleøre. The production featured the actors Patrick Baurichter and Morten Burian. On the opening night, the show had to be paused for about fifteen minutes due to the fact that one audience member vomited and another experienced an epileptic seizure.

See also 
 Consensual crime
 Internet homicide
 Murder of Jun Lin
 Killing of Sharon Lopatka

References

External links 
 Profile: Cannibal Armin Meiwes. BBC News
 Cannibal film banned in Germany. BBC News
 Victim of cannibal agreed to be eaten. The Guardian
 Archived copy of Meiwes's forum post

1961 births
Living people
German cannibals
German people convicted of murder
German prisoners sentenced to life imprisonment
Male murderers
People convicted of murder by Germany
People from Essen
People with schizoid personality disorder
Prisoners sentenced to life imprisonment by Germany
German LGBT people
Criminals from North Rhine-Westphalia
21st-century LGBT people
Filmed killings
Incidents of cannibalism